Basketball is the second most popular sport in France and was first played there in 1893. For females, it is the number one team sport.

History

1893-Post World War 2 
In December 1893, the first European basketball game was played in Paris. French youth were influenced by American culture to play basketball. French basketball teams led in the 1930s European Competition and after World War II.

1948 
At the 1948 Olympics, the French basketball team won its first medal in their basketball history. They ended up with a silver medal after being defeated by the United States.

1951 & 1953 
Under the management of Andre Vacheresse, the team won a bronze medal in Eurobasket.

1960s and 1970s 
This was a low point in France's basketball history because they were not able to compete in major world competitions. No basketball games were played on TV until 1970s came. There were many gyms but people did not play in them because they do not have basketballs.

1980s 
Basketball started to be famous again because NBA was started to be played on TV. The French basketball team was able to return to Olympics in 1984. They also competed in 1986 FIBA World Championship.

2003 
France competed in 2003 Eurobasket with talented members such as Tony Parker, Tariq Abdul-Wahad, and Jerome Moiso, Boris Diaw, Laurent Foirest, Florent Pietrus, and Cyril Julian.

2015-2016 
About 22 French citizens have played in NBA and in Canada for the 2015–2016 season. Very high attendance was observed during the FIBA EuroBasket 2015 and on 2016 FIBA Women's Olympic Qualifying Tournament.

2024 
Paris will host the Olympic Games and Paralympic Games in the summer of 2024. Basketball and 3x3 basketball will be played in those major competitions.

See also 

 France men's national basketball team
 France women's national basketball team
 French Federation of Basketball

References

External links 
 https://www.fiba.basketball/basketballworldcup/2019/team/France#%7Ctab=profile,average_statistics